Contour Airlines is a regional airline headquartered at Smyrna Airport in Smyrna, Tennessee, United States. All Contour Airlines flights are public charters sold and operated by parent company Contour Aviation as a direct carrier.

History

Contour Airlines was established by its parent company Contour Aviation in 2016. Contour began service on March 22, 2016, completing its inaugural flight from Nashville to Tupelo, Mississippi. Since then, Contour has expanded to 20 destinations nationwide, focusing on providing key business and leisure markets previously underserved with nonstop short-haul routes.

On April 1, 2019, Contour retired its Jetstream 31/32 fleet and focused solely on ERJ-135/145 aircraft.

On February 5, 2020, Contour Airlines announced that it would add Indianapolis as a focus city and purchase additional ERJ-135/145 aircraft. The goal was to provide efficient service to markets that are within driving distance but do not have direct flights in order to capture travelers who would rather drive than fly with a layover. The airline planned to serve Nashville, Pittsburgh and St. Louis from Indianapolis beginning June 10, 2020,  however, the service had been suspended indefinitely due to the COVID-19 pandemic. On July 28, 2021, Contour announced its relaunch in Indianapolis, beginning on October 12 and flying to Milwaukee, Nashville, and Pittsburgh. However, Contour quietly dropped Milwaukee and Pittsburgh less than three months later. According to Contour CEO Matt Chaifetz, the Indianapolis to Milwaukee route averaged 40% full and was climbing, but stalled in the winter due to fears over the omicron variant. He said "the timing was just poor" for the new routes, but said, "We're still committed to Indianapolis."

Contour Airlines announced that it had returned to pre-covid numbers in Tupelo, having more than 12,000 boardings in 2022. This helps increase funds granted by the FAA to Tupelo Airport, up from $150,000 to $1,000,000.

Destinations
Contour Airlines operates flights serving the following destinations:

Former destinations

Airline agreements 
In November 2019, Contour launched an interline agreement with American Airlines allowing passengers to travel via Contour and American under a single itinerary. Bookings can be made through third-party travel agencies, through the American Airlines website, or directly through the Contour Airlines website.

In-flight experience
Passengers traveling with Contour receive free seat selection and their first piece of checked baggage without charge on all fare classes. All Contour flights feature leather seating, 36 inches of legroom, and complimentary in-flight snack and beverage service.

References

External links
 Official website

Regional airlines of the United States
Companies based in Tennessee
Airlines established in 1982
1982 establishments in Tennessee
Airlines based in Tennessee
American companies established in 1982
Smyrna, Tennessee
Transportation in Rutherford County, Tennessee